Graeme Reeves (born 1947), a former member of the New Zealand National Party, represented Miramar in Parliament from 1990 to 1993, when he was defeated by Annette King of the Labour Party.

Member of Parliament

In 2004 Reeves was elected president of United Future succeeding former Wellington Mayor Mark Blumsky. Since then, he has stood several times for United Future. In the 2008 election he filled the number 4 slot in the United Future list and stood as a United Future electorate candidate for Wairarapa.

Post-parliamentary career
Reeves was appointed to the New Zealand Gambling Commission in June 2004.  In December 2010 he was appointed as Chief Gambling Commissioner.  He was reappointed as chair for a further three years in July 2012.

Notes

References
 1990 Parliamentary Candidates for the New Zealand National Party p. 43 by John Stringer (New Zealand National Party, 1990)

1947 births
Living people
New Zealand National Party MPs
United Future politicians
20th-century New Zealand lawyers
Victoria University of Wellington alumni
People educated at Rongotai College
New Zealand Conservative Party politicians
Unsuccessful candidates in the 1996 New Zealand general election
Unsuccessful candidates in the 2008 New Zealand general election
Unsuccessful candidates in the 1993 New Zealand general election
Unsuccessful candidates in the 2005 New Zealand general election
Members of the New Zealand House of Representatives
New Zealand MPs for Wellington electorates